The list of shipwrecks in 1813 includes ships sunk, wrecked or otherwise lost during 1813.

January

1 January

2 January

5 January

6 January

7 January

8 January

9 January

11 January

12 January

13 January

14 January

16 January

17 January

19 January

24 January

26 January

27 January

28 January

29 January

30 January

Unknown date

February

1 February

2 February

3 February

4 February

5 February

6 February

7 February

8 February

9 February

10 February

11 February

14 February

15 February

16 February

17 February

18 February

19 February

20 February

21 February

22 February

24 February

26 February

27 February

28 February

Unknown date

March

1 March

4 March

5 March

6 March

11 March

12 March

15 March

16 March

21 March

22 March

23 March

25 March

27 March

28 March

29 March

Unknown date

April

1 April

2 April

3 April

6 April

8 April

12 April

14 April

15 April

16 April

17 April

18 April

21 April

22 April

24 April

26 April

27 April

28 April

30 April

Unknown date

May

1 May

3 May

5 May

7 May

8 May

10 May

16 May

19 May

20 May

23 May

24 May

27 May

29 May

30 May

Unknown date

June

1 June

4 June

11 June

13 June

14 June

16 June

20 June

21 June

26 June

27 June

28 June

Unknown date

July

2 July

3 July

5 July

10 July

16 July

18 July

19 July

21 July

22 July

23 July

24 July

25 July

26 July

27 July

29 July

31 July

Unknown date

August

1 August

2 August

4 August

5 August

8 August

9 August

11 August

12 August

13 August

16 August

17 August

23 August

25 August

26 August

28 August

30 August

Unknown date

September

1 September

3 September

5 September

6 September

7 September

8 September

9 September

11 September

13 September

15 September

17 September

19 September

20 September

21 September

22 September

26 September

27 September

Unknown date

October

1 October

2 October

3 October

4 October

7 October

8 October

9 October

10 October

11 October

12 October

13 October

14 October

15 October

16 October

17 October

20 October

21 October

22 October

23 October

25 October

26 October

27 October

28 October

30 October

31 October

Unknown date

November

1 November

2 November

3 November

4 November

5 November

6 November

7 November

8 November

9 November

10 November

11 November

12 November

13 November

14 November

15 November

16 November

17 November

18 November

19 November

20 November

21 November

22 November

24 November

25 November

26 November

27 November

28 November

29 November

30 November

Unknown date

December

1 December

2 December

3 December

4 December

5 December

7 December

8 December

9 December

10 December

11 December

12 December

13 December

15 December

16 December

17 December

18 December

19 December

20 December

21 December

22 December

23 December

25 December

27 December

29 December

30 December

Unknown date

Unknown date

References

1813